Pembroke Manor is a historic home located at Virginia Beach, Virginia.  It was built in 1764, and is a two-story, five bay, Georgian style brick dwelling.  It is topped by a shallow hipped roof.

It was added to the National Register of Historic Places in 1970.

References

Houses on the National Register of Historic Places in Virginia
Georgian architecture in Virginia
Houses completed in 1764
Houses in Virginia Beach, Virginia
National Register of Historic Places in Virginia Beach, Virginia
1764 establishments in Virginia